Baddesley Clinton is a moated manor house, about 8 miles (13 km) north-west of the town of Warwick, in the village of Baddesley Clinton, Warwickshire, England. The house probably originated in the 13th century, when large areas of the Forest of Arden were cleared for farmland. The site is a Scheduled Ancient Monument and the house is a Grade I listed building. The house, park and gardens are owned by the National Trust and open to the public; they lie in a civil parish of the same name.

History

In 1438 John Brome, Under-Treasurer of England, purchased the manor, which passed to his son, Nicholas Brome (d.1517), who rebuilt the nearby parish church dedicated to St Michael, as a penance for having murdered the parish priest, a crime reputed to have been committed inside the house. The house from this period was equipped with gun-ports, and possibly a drawbridge over the moat. When Nicholas Brome died in 1517, the house passed to his daughter, who in 1500 had married Sir Edward Ferrers, Sheriff of Warwickshire. The house remained in the Ferrers family until 1940, when it was purchased by Thomas Walker, a relative of the family who changed his name to Ferrers. His son, who inherited it in 1970, sold the estate in 1980 to the National Trust, which now manages it.

Henry Ferrers (1549–1633), "The Antiquary", believed to have built the great hall, made many additions to Baddesley Clinton, including starting the tradition of installing stained glass to represent the family's coat of arms. Such glass survives in many rooms. In the 18th century the great hall was rebuilt in brick and the east range was extended, though with great care to continue the style of the original building.
 

The house was inhabited in the 1860s by the novelists Georgiana Chatterton and her second husband Edward Heneage Dering, who both converted to Roman Catholicism. The house's Catholic chapel was rebuilt, and the house was generally refurbished. Major interior changes took place up until the 1940s, with the first floor outside the chapel being completely altered. The interior comprises a great hall, parlour and library, with other rooms, and contains much 16th century carving and furniture and 19th century accessories used by later inhabitants. The house is surrounded by extensive formal gardens and ponds. Many of the farm buildings were built in the 18th century.

Relationship with Catholicism

The Ferrers appear to have remained Roman Catholic recusants after the Reformation, along with many other members of the Warwickshire gentry. They sheltered Catholic priests, who were under threat of a death sentence if discovered, and made special arrangements to hide and protect them. Several priest holes were built, secret passages to hide people in the event of a search by the authorities. One such priest hole is off the Moat Room, and is simply a small room with a door hidden in the wood panelling. A second,  leading into the ceiling, is reputed to hold six people. A third is hidden in an old privy. Fugitives were able to slide down a rope from the first floor through the old garderobe shaft into the house's  sewers, which run the length of the building, which could probably hold a dozen people. These priest holes are said to have been built by Saint Nicholas Owen, a lay-brother of the Jesuits who constructed many masterful hides, notably at nearby Harvington Hall. He was eventually caught and tortured to death by the Protestant English government.

The priest holes came into use at least once, in 1591 when a conference of Jesuit priests was raided by local authorities. They proved effective as no-one was caught.

Gardens and parkland 

Parkland to the north and south-east of the house is today meadow with scattered trees, and ornamental trees south of the house. Pleasure grounds to the south-west lead down to a small lake. A formal walled garden, used in the past as a kitchen garden. lies to the south of the house; the central courtyard of the house is also laid out as a garden. The park and gardens are designated Grade II on the Register of Historic Parks and Gardens.

Filming location
In 1986 a number of exterior and interior shots of Baddesley Clinton were used by Granada Television for its Sherlock Holmes series in the episode "The Adventure of the Musgrave Ritual". In October 2016 the house was the venue for BBC One's Antiques Roadshow.

Although described as "Baddesley Clinton" on the screen, the location used for the outdoor filming of the  first episode of the 2017 BBC One miniseries Gunpowder depicting events surrounding the 1603 Gunpowder Plot raid was not actually Baddesley Clinton, but was Fountains Hall near Ripon in Yorkshire.

References

 Burke, John. History of the Commoners of Great Britain and Ireland, Volume 3 (1835), pp 127–131;

External links

Baddesley Clinton information at the National Trust
photos of Baddesley Clinton and surrounding area on geograph
Warwickshire County Council Timetrail

Country houses in Warwickshire
National Trust properties in Warwickshire
Grade I listed buildings in Warwickshire
Scheduled monuments in Warwickshire
Historic house museums in Warwickshire
Houses with moats
Warwick District